Daniel George Belisle (May 9, 1937 – November 28, 2022) was a Canadian former professional ice hockey player and coach.

Belisle played junior hockey for the Guelph Biltmores and the Trois-Rivières Lions. He then signed with the New York Rangers of the National Hockey League, but his entire NHL career totaled four games during the 1960–61 NHL season. He played fourteen years in the minor leagues, as a member of fifteen different clubs. Belisle's career year came in 1962-63, when he scored 70 points for the San Francisco Seals of the Western Hockey League.

Belisle began his coaching career with the Des Moines Oak Leafs, the final team for which he played. In 1978, he was named head coach of the Washington Capitals, whom he coached to a 24–41–15 record. After a slow start at the beginning of the 1979–80 NHL season, he was fired and replaced by Gary Green. Belisle was voted Central Hockey League coach of the year in 1981 while coaching the Dallas Black Hawks. The Black Hawks, a farm team for the Vancouver Canucks, compiled a 56-16-7, setting records for most victories by a minor league team, most points by a minor league team, most goals scored by a team and most road victories. Belisle later became an assistant coach with the Detroit Red Wings during the early 1980s.

Belisles son Dan Belisle was an ice hockey coach and executive in the North American Hockey League, Southern Hockey League, Colonial Hockey League, and ECHL, most notably serving as general manager for the ECHL's New Orleans Brass, Atlantic City Boardwalk Bullies, and Victoria Salmon Kings.

Belisle died November 28, 2022.

Coaching record

References

External links

Profile at legendsofhockey.net

1937 births
2022 deaths
Baltimore Clippers players
Canadian ice hockey right wingers
Detroit Red Wings coaches
Ice hockey people from Ontario
New York Rangers players
North American Hockey League (1973–1977) coaches
Sportspeople from Timmins
Washington Capitals coaches